Nikanorovka is the name of two rural localities in Russia:
Nikanorovka, Belgorod Oblast, a village in Nikanorovskaya Territorial Administration, Gubkinsky District, Belgorod Oblast
Nikanorovka, Rostov Oblast, a village in Voloshynskoye Selsoviet of Millerovsky District, Rostov Oblast